is a railway station on the Keio Inokashira Line in Suginami, Tokyo, Japan, operated by the private railway operator Keio Corporation.

Lines

Service pattern
Only all-stations "Local" services stop at this station. During the daytime, there are eight services per hour in either direction.

Station layout
The station consists of a single elevated island platform serving two tracks.

In December 2006, renovation of the Keio Retnade shopping center below the station was completed.

Platforms

History
The station opened on 1 August 1933. It was rebuilt as an elevated station, reopening on 15 March 1972.

From 22 February 2013, station numbering was introduced on Keio lines, with Takaido Station becoming "IN12".

Passenger statistics
In fiscal 2011, the station was used by an average of 41,374 passengers daily.

The passenger figures for previous years are as shown below.

References

External links

 Takaido Station information (Keio) 

Railway stations in Tokyo
Railway stations in Japan opened in 1933